"Do the Bartman" is a song from the 1990 album The Simpsons Sing the Blues, featuring the voice cast of the American animated television series The Simpsons. It was performed by The Simpsons cast member Nancy Cartwright (the voice of Bart Simpson), with backing vocals from American singer Michael Jackson, alongside additional vocals from Dan Castellaneta (voice of Homer Simpson). Jackson also produced the song, which was written by American recording artist Bryan Loren, and Geffen Records released it as a single on November 20, 1990.

Despite receiving much radio airplay in the United States, "Do the Bartman" was never officially released as a single there. It topped the charts in Australia, Ireland, New Zealand, Norway, and the United Kingdom. The song additionally reached the top 10 in Belgium, Denmark, Finland, the Netherlands, Spain, and Sweden. A music video, directed by Brad Bird, was released for the song in 1991. The video became a hit on the American network MTV, and received a nomination at the 1991 MTV Video Music Awards.

Michael Jackson's involvement 

The album The Simpsons Sing the Blues was released in December 1990. The first single from it was the rap song "Do the Bartman", performed by Bart Simpson's voice actor Nancy Cartwright and released on November 20, 1990. Rumors began spreading in the summer of 1990 that Michael Jackson would write a song for Bart on the album.

This song was reported early on to be "Do the Bartman", but executive producer James L. Brooks issued a press release in September 1990 apologizing for the misunderstanding and stating that song was actually written by one of Jackson's friends, Bryan Loren.

However, The Simpsons creator Matt Groening later stated during an appearance at the February 1998 World Animation Celebration convention in Pasadena, California that "Do the Bartman" was actually co-written and co-produced by Jackson, but he could not receive credit for it because he was under contract to Epic Records. Groening told a crowd at the convention that had gathered for a "The Simpsons tribute" that it had "always [been] amazing to me that no one ever found out that Michael Jackson wrote that song. [...] He was a big fan of the show."

Jackson was a fan of The Simpsons, especially Bart, and had called the producers one night offering to write Bart a number one single and do a guest spot on the show, which is how "Do the Bartman" came about. Jackson eventually guest-starred in the episode "Stark Raving Dad" (season three, 1991) under the pseudonym John Jay Smith.

He also wrote the song "Happy Birthday Lisa" for the episode "Stark Raving Dad", which was later included in the album Songs in the Key of Springfield. Bryan Loren has stated that Jackson had provided background vocals for "Do the Bartman".

In July 2015, when Bryan Loren was selling the publishing and songwriting rights for the song, Loren stated that "despite Matt Groening's repeated confessions, I am the sole writer of the song". Loren stated that Jackson's contributions included backup vocals and providing the title "Do the Bartman" and that Jackson insisted his own name be mentioned in the lyrics.

Critical reception 
Critical reviews of "Do the Bartman" were mostly positive. Larry Flick from Billboard said the single "seems like a logical extension of the public's love affair with Fox TV's popular cartoon characters. This cute and amusing pop/new jack novelty doesn't actually teach any new dance steps, but that hasn't kept radio from jumping on it out of the box." Monika Bartyzel of Cinematical, however, thought the song was a "cheesy number." The Daily Vault's Benny Balneg liked that it disengaged itself from the album's "blues tag" and incorporated more "contemporary elements" into its sound. He added that he thought the song had a "catchy beat" and an "infectious chorus." Ken Tucker of Entertainment Weekly described it as "not bad," and commented that Bart's high voice "echoes the beats nicely." The Long Beach Press-Telegrams Patricia Smith called "Do the Bartman" a "surprisingly funky tune." A reviewer from People Magazine stated, "Yes, of course the first single, 'Do the Bartman', will be a novelty hit. Written by Bryan Loren, it's a white-bread rap featuring Nancy Cartwright's vocals, reeling off tales of Bart's mischievous ways."

 Chart performance 
The song topped the charts in Australia, Ireland, New Zealand, Norway, and the United Kingdom. In the latter country, the song spent three weeks at the top of the UK Singles Chart, and became Britain's seventh best selling song of 1991. "Do the Bartman" has shipped at least 400,000 units in the United Kingdom, and was certified gold by the British Phonographic Industry on February 1, 1991. The song's success in the United Kingdom was remarkable, given that at that time The Simpsons was airing only on British satellite television station Sky One. It would be five years before it first aired on terrestrial television in Britain, airing on BBC One and later BBC Two.

In Ireland, "Do the Bartman"  spent nine weeks at number one on the Irish Singles Chart from January 24, 1991, to March 24, 1991. Only nine singles have ever managed a longer run at number one in that country. The song also charted at number one on New Zealand's RIANZ Singles Chart on the issue date of January 25, 1991, and peaked at number one on the chart again, for a total of two weeks, from February 8, 1991, to February 15, 1991.

In March 1991, "Do the Bartman" became the first single to reach number one in Australia that was not available on 7-inch vinyl.

 Music video 
The music video for "Do the Bartman" features the typical plot of Bart rebelling against authority when he decides to put his own spin on a rigidly choreographed dance presentation at Springfield Elementary School. The music video for "Do the Bartman" was directed by Brad Bird, with dance choreography by Michael Chambers. Nobody from the staff of The Simpsons wanted to direct it because they were busy doing the show, but Bird finally agreed to do it after having been asked four times. He had a very short amount of time to finish the video because it was supposed to coincide with the release of The Simpsons Sing the Blues.

The entire music video was storyboarded in only two days in the United States. Bird then got on a plane to Budapest, Hungary, where the video was animated by Varga Studio. They thought the video was going to be animated as simply as the original The Simpsons shorts, shown on The Tracey Ullman Show, so when Bird told them that it was going to be done in full animation with no repeated scenes, they "went into deep shock".

The animators added the wraparound at the beginning to set Bart against the crowd and put the video in "some sort of context."

The video was nominated for Best Special Effects at the 1991 MTV Video Music Awards. It originally premiered on Fox after the episode "Bart the Daredevil" on December 6, 1990, and was the number one music video on rotation on MTV between January and March 1991. Along with the music video for "Deep, Deep Trouble", the video was included on The Simpsons: The Complete Second Season DVD boxset in 2002. Following the death of Michael Jackson on June 25, 2009, the music video was broadcast by Fox on June 28, 2009—ahead of a rerun of the episode "Wedding for Disaster"—and featured a title card paying tribute to Jackson.

There is an alternative version of the music video that removes the references to Michael Jackson's "hair strand" (by not including said hair strand in frame), people dancing to the Bartman on a cruise ship with the Statue of Liberty in the background moving side to side with the rhythm of the song and replaces it with extra frames of the Springfield "cool kids" dancing along. The alternative version also removes the lyric, "She can do it, he can do it, so can I".

 Track listings 
 7-inch single: "Do the Bartman" (7" House Mix/Edit) – 3:54
 "Do the Bartman" (LP edit) – 3:59

 CD single: "Do the Bartman" (7" House Mix/Edit) – 3:54
 "Do the Bartman" (LP edit) – 3:59
 "Do the Bartman" (Bad Bart House Mix) – 4:49
 "Do the Bartman" (a cappella) – 3:44

 Digital download:'
 "Do the Bartman" (Diplo's Bartman So So Krispy Remix) – 4:27

Personnel 
 Nancy Cartwright – lead vocals
 Michael Jackson – backing vocals
 Dan Castellaneta, Julie Kavner, Yeardley Smith, and Matt Groening – additional voices
 Bryan Loren – backing vocals, instruments
 Paul Jackson Jr. – additional guitar
 Laurie Rox, Bart Stevens, and Richard Voltrop – background shouting

Production 
 Richard Cottrell – recording engineer
 Bryan Loren & Michael Jackson – producers
 Julie Last & Bart Stevens – assistant recording engineers
 Mixed at Larrabee Sound Studios

Charts

Weekly charts

Year-end charts

Certifications

Release history

See also 
 List of number-one singles in Australia during the 1990s
 List of number-one singles of 1991 (Ireland)
 List of number-one singles in 1991 (New Zealand)
 List of number-one hits in Norway
 List of UK Singles Chart number ones of the 1990s

References

External links 
 

1990 songs
1990 debut singles
The Simpsons songs
Irish Singles Chart number-one singles
UK Singles Chart number-one singles
Number-one singles in Australia
Number-one singles in New Zealand
Number-one singles in Norway
New jack swing songs
Hip hop songs
Novelty songs
Songs written by Bryan Loren
Geffen Records singles
Songs about dancing
Novelty and fad dances